House of Brothers is an English indie pop band founded by Andrew Jackson. It was originally a solo project by Jackson, whose first EP Deadman was released in 2007. House of Brothers expanded to a full band in early 2008, and released the EP Document 1 to positive reviews.

Members
 Andrew Jackson
 Mathew Pugh
 Luke J. Moss
 Peter Banks

Discography
 Deadman (EP, Big Scary Monsters, 2007)
 Document 1 (EP, Rough Trade, 2009)

References

External links
 House of Brothers (official MySpace site)
 House of Brothers (official blog)

English indie rock groups